Hinghwa Romanized, also known as Hing-hua̍ báⁿ-uā-ci̍ (興化平話字) or Báⁿ-uā-ci̍ (平話字), is a Latin alphabet of the Putian dialect of Pu-Xian Chinese. It was invented by William N. Brewster (蒲魯士), an American Methodist pioneer missionary in Hinghwa (modern Putian) in 1890.

Writing system

Alphabet
Hinghwa Romanized has 23 letters: .

Finals

Tone

Example text
Tai̍-che̤ ū Dō̤, Dō̤ gah Siō̤ng-Da̤̍ dó̤ng-cāi, Dō̤ cuh sī Siō̤ng-Da̤̍. Ca̤̍ Dō̤ ta̍i-che̤ gah Sio̤ng-Da̤̍ dó̤ng-cāi. Māng-beo̍h sī ciā da̤u̍h I cho̤̍ ē; hang pī cho̤̍, beo̍ seo̍h-ā̤uⁿ ng-sī ciā da̤u̍h I cho̤̍ ē.

太初有道，道佮上帝同在，道就是上帝。這道太初佮上帝同在。萬物是借著伊造兮，含被造兮，無一樣呣是借著伊造兮。

In the beginning was the Word, and the Word was with God, and the Word was God. The same was in the beginning with God. All things were made by him; and without him was not any thing made that was made. (John 1:1-3 KJV)

Compared with Pe̍h-ōe-jī and Foochow Romanized

References
刘福铸：兴化话罗马字研究
高德矞：兴化话与罗马字

External links
Chinese Character to Puxian Min (Hinghwa) Transliterator

Pu-Xian Min
Latin-script orthographies
Romanization of Chinese
1890 introductions